Stephen Wakelam is an English writer and playwright born in Chesterfield, Derbyshire. After Cambridge University, he was an English Teacher and Head of Department in South Yorkshire until he became a full-time writer in 1976.  He was Young Writers' Tutor at the Royal Court Theatre from 1981-1984 and then tutored young playwrights at the National Theatre Studio in the 1990s.  He has  written over forty performed plays, at first mainly in television then primarily on radio. His subjects are almost exclusively biographical, covering a broad range of interests.  Wakelam was The Royal Literary Society Writer in Residence at universities in Leeds and Kent, 2009-12. From January 2015 he is Writer in Residence at St Cuthbert's Society, Durham.

Selected works
The Pattern of Painful Adventures
Gaskin
Coppers
Angel Voices
Circles of Deceit
Deadlines
Two Men from Delft
Adulteries of a Provincial Wife
Answered Prayers
Death at the Bed End
Punters
Hard Knocks
Selling Immortality
The Finding
The Good Samaritan
To the Camp and Back
Miss A and Miss M
Letting the Birds Go Free
Rainy Day
Other Women
Triangle at Rhodes
Silver Lining
Tea Leaf on the Roof
The Fox
Grassroots
Released
Time Passing
What I Think of my Husband
A Dose of Fame
Living With Princes, on the life of Montaigne (2011)

References

External links
Personal website
Radio work

Living people
Year of birth missing (living people)
People from Chesterfield, Derbyshire
English dramatists and playwrights
English male dramatists and playwrights